"So High" is a 2013 song by American musician Ghost Loft. The song appeared in the compilation Kitsuné America 2 as the first track in the compilation. "So High" was released as the follow up of Ghost Loft single "Seconds".

Wiz Khalifa version
Wiz Khalifa included a version of the song in his album Blacc Hollywood. The song included additional rap lyrics by Wiz Khalifa and features Ghost Loft. The song released on August 12, 2014 is written by Tor Erik Hermansen, Mikkel S. Eriksen, Cameron Thomaz and Danny Choi and produced by Stargate and Ghost Loft.

Charts

References

Wiz Khalifa songs
Atlantic Records singles
2013 songs
Songs written by Tor Erik Hermansen
Songs written by Mikkel Storleer Eriksen
Songs written by Wiz Khalifa
Song recordings produced by Stargate (record producers)